Buddy Rich in Miami is a 1958 Verve live album by Buddy Rich featuring Flip Phillips recorded at the Dream Bar of the Johnina Hotel in Miami Beach, Florida in 1957.

The album has been re-issued on CD alone and also, as Live in Miami with Flip Phillips, together with several additional tracks from a 1954 Rich/Phillips LA studio recording session with the Oscar Peterson Trio.

Track listing 
Buddy Rich in Miami
 "Lover, Come Back to Me" (Oscar Hammerstein II, Sigmund Romberg)
 "Topsy" (Edgar Battle, Eddie Durham)
 "Undecided" (Leo Robin, Charlie Shavers)
 "Broadway" (Billy Bird, Teddy McRae, Henri Woode)
 "Jumpin' at the Woodside" (Basie) – 10:11

Live in Miami with Flip Phillips re-issue 
 "Lover, Come Back to Me"
 "Topsy"
 "Undecided"
 "Broadway"
 "Jumpin' at the Woodside
 "Lemon Aid 21"
 "I'll Never Be The Same"
 "All of Me"
 "I've Got the World on a String"
 "Almost Like Being in Love"
 "The Lady's in Love with You"
 "Singing the Blues"
 "Birth of the Blues"

Personnel 
Buddy Rich in Miami / Live in Miami... (tracks 1-5)
 Buddy Rich - drums
 Flip Phillips - tenor saxophone
 Ronnie Ball - piano
 Peter Ind - double bass
Live in Miami... (tracks 6-13)
 Buddy Rich - drums
 Flip Phillips - tenor saxophone
 Oscar Peterson - piano
 Ray Brown - bass
 Herb Ellis - guitar

References 

Buddy Rich live albums
Albums produced by Norman Granz
1958 live albums
Verve Records live albums